The 1931–32 season was the 26th year of football played by Dundee United, and covers the period from 1 July 1931 to 30 June 1932.

Match results
Dundee United played a total of 44 matches during the 1931–32 season.

Legend

All results are written with Dundee United's score first.
Own goals in italics

First Division

Scottish Cup

References

Dundee United F.C. seasons
Dundee United